Henryk Baranowski (9 February 1943 – 27 July 2013) was a Polish theatre, opera and film director, actor, stage designer, playwright, screenwriter, and poet. He is best known for his starring role in the film Dekalog: One directed by Krzysztof Kieślowski, and also appeared as Rosa's brother Josef in Rosa Luxemburg directed by Margarethe von Trotta and as Napoleon in Pan Tadeusz directed by Andrzej Wajda. He directed over 60 theater and opera productions in Europe, Russia and the US and was the Artistic Director of the Teatr Śląski (Silesian Theatre) in Katowice in the mid 2000s. He also directed four "television theatre" productions: ...yes I will Yes (1992, adapted from Ulysses by James Joyce), For Phaedra (1998), Saint Witch (2003), and Night is the Mother of Day (2004).

Early life
Baranowski’s father Stanisław Baranowski was a well-known conductor and violinist in the Lviv Philharmonic, and his mother Irena (née Filbert) was the daughter of a Tsarist army officer in Kharkov. They met during the Second World War after the father had been transferred to the Kharkov opera following the Battle of Lwów in 1939. In 1942, the couple attempted to move away from the war torn region to Crakow, but only got as far as Tarnopol. That fall, the father was killed while searching for food by members of the Banderites.  Henryk was born in Tarnopol on 9 February 1943, four months after his father's death.

In 1944, the Baranowski family was deported to Germany to work in a labor camp near Bremen, where they remained for the last year of the war. They stayed in the American Zone of Occupation for three years, then moved first to Kliczków in Lower Silesia then to Bolesławiec.

Baranowski studied mathematics at the University of Wrocław and was a graduate of Philosophy at the University of Warsaw (1968) and the Director's Department at the State Theater School in Warsaw (1973).

Theatre
Baranowski made his directorial debut in 1973 at the Ateneum Theatre in Warsaw with The Maids by Jean Genet, and went on to direct several productions in theatres in Poland, including Man and Wife by Aleksander Fredro at the Teatr im. W. Bogusławski in Kalisz; Four of Them by Gabriela Zapolska at the Baltic Drama Theatre in Koszalin; Ghosts by Henrik Ibsen and Offending the Audience by Peter Handke at Teatr Polski in Bydgoszcz; Hello and Goodbye by Athol Fugard, The Castle by Franz Kafka, Princess Ivona by Witold Gombrowicz and Forefather's Eve by Adam Mickiewicz at the Theatre Jaracza in Olsztyn; School for Wives by Molière at the Teatr Polski in Poznań; and Long Day's Journey into Night by Eugene O’Neill and Totenhorn by Kazimierz Truchanowski at the Teatr Śląski (Silesian Theatre) in Katowice.

On the opening night of Totenhorn, Communist Party officials in attendance walked out, and the government shut down the production the next day.  A literary conference was taking place nearby, and the writers organized a petition that reversed the decision.  Baranowski staged one final production in Poland – Kafka's The Trial at the Palace of Culture and Science in Warsaw – before leaving the country.

Baranowski emigrated to West Berlin in 1980 and rose to prominence in the city's Freie Theater scene, co-founding the company and theatre school TransformTheater Berlin and the International Directing Seminar at the Künstlerhaus Bethanien with Swiss filmmaker Bettina Wilhelm.

Baranowski's stage adaptations of works by Joyce, Kafka and Dostoyevsky formed the core of TransformTheater Berlin's repertoire. In the early years, he mounted his productions in Berlin, but once the greater openness that followed the founding of Solidarity had been institutionalized, he renewed his work in Poland. Concurrently, he began working in regional theaters in Germany and internationally. His productions were presented at Berlin’s Hebbel am Ufer, the Gulbenkian Foundation in Lisbon, the Mittelfest in Italy, the European Theatre Festival in Cracow, and numerous other festivals and venues in Poland, Germany, Russia, Italy, Norway and the USA. In the mid-1990s, he moved to a house in Brwinów, a suburb of Warsaw.

Baranowski made his English language debut with George Tabori's Peepshow in Chicago in 1991, which won a Joseph Jefferson Award for Best Ensemble.  He went on to direct a number of other productions in the US in New York, Las Vegas, and Knoxville, Tennessee.  In May 2001, he made his UK directing debut with an adaptation of Fyodor Dostoyevsky's The Idiot, produced by The Playground at the Riverside Studios in London.

Baranowski's 2009 production of Loneliness on the Net, adapted from the novel by Janusz Leon Wiśniewski, has remained in the repertoire of the 837-seat Main Stage of the Baltic House in Saint Petersburg, Russia through the 2017/18 season, almost a decade after its premiere.

Opera
Later in his career, Baranowski’s attention turned increasing to opera. His production of Philip Glass’ Akhnaten for the Teatr Wielki in Łodzi won a Silver Boat for Best Production and a Golden Mask for Best Director. His staging of Alfred Schnittke's Life with an Idiot in a co-production by the Novosibirsk State Academic Opera and Ballet Theatre and Hahn Produktion in Berlin won three Russian Golden Mask Awards, including Best Production.

Theatre productions (director)
Theatre productions:
 1971 – The Maids   Teatr Ateneum im. S. Jaracza, Warsaw
 1971 – School of Wives   Teatr Polski, Poznań
 1971 – The Other Room'''   Teatr w Opolu
 1972 – Poison, Love, Singing (after Carlo Goldoni's The Two Venetian Twins) Teatr im. W. Bogusławskiego, Kalisz (also libretto)
 1973 – Ghosts   Teatr Polski, Bydgoszcz and Teatr im. Wojciecha Bogusławskiego, Kalisz (also adaptation)
 1974 – La Dame aux Camélias   Bałtycki Teatr Dramatyczny im. Juliusza Słowackiego, Koszalin-Słupsk (also stage adaptation)
 1974 – Twins Today(after Carlo Goldoni's The Two Venetian Twins) Bałtycki Teatr Dramatyczny im. Juliusza Słowackiego w Koszalinie 
 1975 – Four of Them   Bałtycki Teatr Dramatyczny im. Juliusza Słowackiego w Koszalin-Słupsk
 1975 – The Maids   Teatr Polski, Bydgoszcz
 1975 – Offending the Audience   Teatr Polski, Bydgoszcz
 1975 – Life Lines stage adaptation of African poetry Estrada, Szczecin
 1975 – The Castle   Teatr im. S. Jaracza, Olsztyn-Elbląg
 1976 – Hello and Goodbye   Teatr im. Stefana Jaracza, Olsztyn-Elbląg
 1976 – Princess Ivona   Teatr im. Stefana Jaracza, Olsztyn-Elbląg
 1977 – Forefather's Eve   Teatr im. Stefana Jaracza, Olsztyn-Elbląg (also stage adaptation)
 1978 – Long Day's Journey into Night   Silesian Theatre, Katowice (also design)
 1978 – Totenhorn   Silesian Theatre, Katowice (also stage adaptation)
 1979 – The Source   Teatr Polski, Szczecin
 1979 – The Trial   Teatr Studio at the Palace of Culture and Science, Warsaw
 1981 – The Maids   TransformTheater Berlin
 1983 – Termitière Suprème-Anthropomorphosen (site-specific performance in urban plaza, texts by James Joyce) TransformTheater Berlin
 1985 – He Who Gets Slapped   TransformTheater Berlin at the Renaissance Theater, Berlin 
 1985 – Japanese Games   TransformTheater Berlin at Künstlerhaus Hannover, tour to Oslo, Bergen and Aarhus
 1985 – Despoiled Shore. Medeamaterial. Landscape with Argonauts   Teatr Studio at the Palace of Culture and Science, Warsaw and Theatermanufaktur Berlin
 1986 – King David   TransformTheater Berlin at za Granicą
 1987 – Operetta   TransformTheater Berlin at Hebbel am Ufer
 1988 – Explosion of a Memory  TransformTheater Berlin at Teatr Studio at the Palace of Culture and Science, Warsaw and Berlin
 1989 – The Trial   Freie Volksbuehne, Berlin, tour to za Granicą Festival and the Rassegna Internationale Teatri Stabili, Florence
 1989 – Ghost Sonata   TransformTheater Berlin at the Oslo International Theater Festival and Bergen International Theater
 1990 – Suppressed and Offended   Omsk Drama Theatre, Siberia and Theater Der Welt at the Grillo-Theater, Essen
 1990 – The Old Woman Broods   TransformTheater Berlin (also adaptation and design)
 1991 – ...yes I will Yes   stage adaptation of Joyce's Ulysses Teatr Szwedzka 2/4, Warsaw (also adaptation and design)
 1991 – Peepshow TransformTheater Berlin/Facets Performance Studio at Chopin Theatre, Chicago (also design)
 1992 – ...a way alone a last a loved a long the riverrun aka Water Dreams of a Shy Monster: a sensuation on James Joyce aka Bieg rzeki stage adaptation of sections of Ulysses, Exiles, Finnegans Wake and Nora: The Real Life of Molly Bloom by Brenda Maddox TransformTheater Berlin at Calouste Gulbenkian Foundation, Lisbon; Polish Cultural Center at Alexanderplatz, Berlin; Sala Sołota / European Theater Festival, Cracow; 'Kontakt' International Theater Festival, Torun; Adam Mickiewicz Theatre, Cieszyn; Theaterhaus Stuttgart; Moscow (also adaptation)
 1992 – The Castle   Teatr Szwedzka 2/4, Warsaw and Cividale Mittelfest (also stage adaptation, stage design and lighting design)
 1992 – The Balcony   Omsk Drama Theatre
 1993 – Ghosts   Instytut Teatru Narodowego, Warsaw (also design)
 1993 – Pentesilea   Cracow (also design)
 1994 – Ghetto Staatstheater Cottbus
 1995 – Peepshow   Teatr Rozmaitości, Warsaw (also design)
 1996 – Black Comedy   Teatr Bagatela Kraków (also design)
 1996 – The Trial   Teatr Rozmaitości, Warsaw (also design)
 1997 – Macbeth   Theater 2000, Zagreb at Pula Castle
 1997 – My Mother/When We Dead Awaken Artaud/Bataille/Ibsen Artaud Festival, Bergen
 1998 – White Marriage   Playwrights Horizons/New York University
 1998 – Mein Kampf   Clarence Brown Theatre, Knoxville
 1998 – Hess   Deutsche Nationaltheater, Weimar
 1999 – Ghosts   Clarence Brown Theatre
 1999 – Captain Ulysses Heidelberg Festival
 2000 – The Oresteia   Clarence Brown Theatre, Knoxville and Bratislava
 2001 – The Balcony   UNLV University Theatre at the Judy Bayley Theatre
 2001 – The Idiot   The Playground at Riverside Studios, London UK
 2002 – The Flies  Istrapolitana Festival, Bratislava (also adaptation and design)
 2004 – Mein Kampf   Silesian Theatre, Katowice (also design)
 2004 – Division By Zero   Silesian Theatre, Katowice
 2006 – Macbeth. Work in Progress.   Silesian Theatre, Katowice
 2006 – The Old Woman Broods   Teatr Ludowy, Kraków
 2009 – Loneliness on the Net   Baltic House, St. Petersburg, Russia
 2012 – The Tempest   Volkov Theatre, Yaroslavl

Opera productions
Opera productions:
 1993 – Die Fledermaus   Teatr Wielki im. Stanisława Moniuszki, Poznań (also adaptation and lighting design) tour of the Netherlands
 2000 – Akhnaten   Teatr Wielki, Łódź (also design)
 2001 – Porgy and Bess   Teatr Wielki, Łódź
 2003 – Life With an Idiot   Novosibirsk State Academic Opera and Ballet Theatre and Hahn Produktion Toured to Moscow and Rome and to Munich, Magdeburg, and the Deutsche Oper in Berlin as part of the Russian Culture Days in Germany 2003/4
 2004 – Rigoletto   Opera Krakowska
 2006 – Lady Macbeth of Mtsensk   Novosibirsk State Academic Opera and Ballet Theatre
 2007 – The Barber of Seville   Teatr Wielki, Łódź (also adaptation, design)
 2012 – The Elixir of Love   Opera Krakowska (also design)

Television productions
Television productions:
 1992 – ...yes I will Yes (also wrote screenplay)
 1998 – For Phaedra 2003 – Saint Witch 2004 – Night is the Mother of DaySelected filmography
Films:
 Wszystko (1972, dir. Piotr Szulkin)
 Rosa Luxemburg Josef, Rosa's brother (1986, dir. Margarethe von Trotta)
 Dekalog Krzysztof (1988, dir. Krzysztof Kieslowski)
 Dekalog: One 
 Dekalog: Three Pan Tadeusz Napoleon Bonaparte (1999, dir. Andrzej Wajda)

Radio productions
Radio productions for Teatr Polskiego Radia:
 2011 – Dziewanna by Jacek Dobrowolski
 2012 – A Dream About King David by Helmut Kajzar
 2012 – Tułacze (after Exiles by James Joyce)
 2012 – When We Dead Awaken by Henrik Ibsen

Awards
 1976 – First prize for Hello and Goodbye at the Festival of Small-Theatre-Forms "KONTRAPUNKT" in Szczecin
 1976 – First prize for adaptation and direction for The Castle at the XVIII Festival of North Polish Theatres in Toruń	
 1991 – ITI Award for Promotion of Polish Theatre Culture Abroad
 1992 – Award from the Minister of Foreign Affairs for Outstanding Merit in the Promotion of Polish Culture and Art Abroad	
 1992 – Joseph Jefferson Award for Best Ensemble for Peepshow, TransformTheater Berlin/Facets Performance Studio	
 2000 – Golden Mask for Best Director and Silver Boat for best production for Akhnaten, Teatr Wielki, Łódź	
 2004 – Golden Mask for Best Opera Production for Life with An Idiot'', Novosibirsk Opera and Ballet Theatre

References

External links

1943 births
2013 deaths
Polish male film actors
Polish theatre directors
Writers from Ternopil
University of Warsaw alumni
Deaths from cancer in Poland